Dun-le-Poëlier is a commune in the Indre department in central France.

History
During World War II, Dun-le-Poëlier was liberated by Free French troops in September 1944 following an engagement with the German Tiger Legion.

Population

See also
Communes of the Indre department

References

Communes of Indre